Saleh Barakat (born in 1969 in Beirut, Lebanon) is a Lebanese art expert, gallery owner and curator. He studied at the American University of Beirut and was nominated as a Yale World Fellow in 2006. He runs Agial Art Gallery and Saleh Barakat Gallery in the Ras Beirut area.

Profile
Saleh Barakat inaugurated the Agial Art Gallery in 1991, in the immediate aftermath of the Lebanese Civil War. Since then, he expanded, becoming a leading advocate for Modern Arab painters in the art market, with high expectations to see them enter the museums. Being responsible for building major art collections in the region.

Saleh Barakat deals with works from established Modern artists from Lebanon and the Arab World, such as Saloua Raouda Choucair to whom he organized a retrospective exhibition at the Beirut Exhibition Center. He also has a team of younger talents including Oussama Baalbaki, Mohamad Said Baalbaki, Tagreed Darghouth, Abdulrahman Katanani, Tamara Al Samerraei, Chaza Charefeddine and Ayman Baalbaki, his most successful protégé. Baalbaki got extremely high bids at recent auctions. In April 2011, one of his works was auctioned at US$206,500.

Curatorial Practice
Saleh Barakat, who participated to numerous roundtables and educational programs, has participated in the organization of keystone exhibitions for Lebanese and Middle Eastern Art. In 2007, he co-curated with Sandra Dagher the 1st Lebanese Pavilion at the Venice Biennale. The Pavilion featured a collective exhibition of Fouad Elkoury, Lamia Joreige, Walid Sadek, Mounira al Solh and Akram Zaatari.

In 2009, he curated the Road to Peace at Beirut Art Center. The exhibition featured paintings, photographs, drawings, prints and sculptures by Lebanese artists during the war. Its title comes from a series of prints by Aref Rayess that depict Lebanese survivors of war. The Road to Peace featured Rafic Charaf, Fouad Elkoury,  Paul Guiragossian, Hassan Jouni, Samir Khaddage, Seta Manoukian, Saloua Raouda Choucair, Mohammad Rawas, Aref Rayess and others.

Barakat has been appointed to manage a museum project at the American University of Beirut. This project follows a donation by Dr Samir Saleeby, who happens to be a relative of the late Khalil Saleeby (1870-1928), a pioneer of Lebanese painting, and consists of 30 paintings from Saleeby himself and Saliba Douaihy, César Gemayel and Omar Onsi.

Saleh Barakat is member of the advisory board of the Lebanese American University School of Architecture and Design as well a board member of the Lebanese National Commission for UNESCO (LNCU).

Artists 
 Abdul Rahman Katanani
 Anachar Basbous
 Ayman Baalbaki
 Chaza Charafeddine
 Daniele Genadry
 Fadia Haddad
 Gebran Tarazi
 Ginane Makki Bacho
 Hady Sy
 Hala Ezzeddine
 Hala Schoukair
 Hiba Kalache
 Houmam Sayed
 Michel Basbous
 Mohammad Rawas
 Mona Saudi
 Nabil Nahas
 Nadia Safieddine
 Omar Fakhoury
 Oussama Baalbaki
 Rima Amyuni
 Said Baalbaki
 Samir Sayigh
 Saloua Raouda Schoukair
 Samar Mogharbel
 Shafic Abboud
 Shawki Youssef
 Tagreed Dargouth
 Tanbak
 Ziad Abillama

Curated Exhibitions 

2014
 Michel Basbous, Beirut Exhibition Center

2012
 Shafic Abboud (with Nadine Begdache), Beirut Exhibition Center

2011
 Saloua Raouda Choucair, Beirut Exhibition Center

2010
 De lumière et de sang, Foundation Audi, Beirut

2009
 Mediterranean Crossroad

2009
 The Road to Peace: Paintings in Times of War, 1975–1991, Beirut Art Center

2007
 Pavilion of Lebanon (with Sandra Dagher), Venice Biennale

2002
 Ateliers Arabes, 9th Francophonie Summit Art Exhibition, Beirut

References

External links
•	Website of Agial Art Gallery

•	Website of Saleh Barakat Gallery

•	Profile on Yale World Fellows

Lebanese art collectors
Lebanese art dealers
Businesspeople from Beirut
1967 births
Living people